Kamler is a surname. Notable people with the surname include:

Brian Kamler (born 1972), American soccer player
Erin Kamler (born 1975), American writer and composer
Ewa Kamler (born 1937), Polish biologist
Kenneth Kamler, American surgeon

See also
18891 Kamler, a main-belt asteroid
Kammler, a surname